Walter E. "Furry" Lewis (March 6, 1893 or 1899 – September 14, 1981) was an American country blues guitarist and songwriter from Memphis, Tennessee. He was one of the first of the blues musicians active in the 1920s to be brought out of retirement and given new opportunities to record during the folk blues revival of the 1960s.

Life and career
Lewis was born in Greenwood, Mississippi. His birth year is uncertain. Many sources give 1893, the date he gave in his later years, but the researchers Bob Eagle and Eric LeBlanc suggest 1899, based on his 1900 census entry, and other sources suggest 1895 or 1898. His family moved to Memphis when he was seven. He acquired the nickname "Furry" from childhood playmates. By 1908, he was playing solo at parties, in taverns, and on the street. He was also invited to play several dates with W. C. Handy's Orchestra.

In his travels as a musician, he was exposed to a wide variety of performers, including Bessie Smith, Blind Lemon Jefferson, and Alger "Texas" Alexander. Like his contemporary Frank Stokes, he grew tired of traveling and took a permanent job in 1922. His position as a street sweeper for the city of Memphis, a job he held until his retirement in 1966, allowed him to continue performing music in Memphis.

Lewis made his first recordings for Vocalion Records in Chicago in 1927. A year later he recorded for Victor Records at the Memphis Auditorium, in a session with the Memphis Jug Band, Jim Jackson, Frank Stokes, and others. He again recorded for Vocalion in Memphis in 1929. The tracks were mostly blues but included two-part versions of "Casey Jones" and "John Henry". He sometimes fingerpicked and sometimes played with a slide. He made many successful records in the late 1920s, including "Kassie Jones", "Billy Lyons & Stack-O-Lee" and "Judge Harsh Blues" (later called "Good Morning Judge").

On October 3, 1959, Sam Charters, with the assistance of his wife Ann Charters, recorded Furry in his rented room in Memphis, Tennessee. The recordings were released on a Folkways Records LP that same year.  On April 3, 1961, Charters again recorded two albums of Furry Lewis - this time at the Sun Studio in Memphis, Tennessee, for the Prestige / Bluesville  imprint: "Back on my Feet Again" (BV 1036), and "Done Changed my Mind" (BV 1037). One track was included in Sam and Ann Charters' movie "The Blues," finished in 1962, and finding wide release, after being lost for many years, in a 2020 package entitled "Searching for Secret Heroes," by Document Records, thanks to producer Gary Atkinson.

In July 1968, Bob West recorded Furry Lewis along with Bukka White in Lewis's Memphis apartment.  In 1972 West, with Bob Graf, in Seattle, released the recording on a 12-inch vinyl record. In 2001 the recording was released on CD as "Furry Lewis, Bukka White & Friends, Party! at Home", by Arcola Records.

In 1969, the record producer Terry Manning recorded Lewis in his Fourth Street apartment in Memphis, near Beale Street. These recordings were released in Europe at the time by Barclay Records and again in the early 1990s by Lucky Seven Records in the United States and in 2006 by Universal Records.

In 1972 he was the featured performer in the Memphis Blues Caravan, which included Bukka White, Sleepy John Estes, Clarence Nelson, Hammie Nixon, Memphis Piano Red, Sam Chatmon, and Mose Vinson.

He opened twice for the Rolling Stones, performed on The Tonight Show Starring Johnny Carson, had a part in a Burt Reynolds movie (W.W. and the Dixie Dancekings, 1975), and was profiled in Playboy magazine.

Joni Mitchell's song "Furry Sings the Blues" (on her album Hejira), is about her visit to Lewis's apartment and a mostly ruined Beale Street on February 5, 1976. Lewis despised the Mitchell song and felt she should pay him royalties for being its subject.

Lewis began to lose his eyesight because of cataracts in his final years. He contracted pneumonia in 1981, which led to his death from heart failure in Memphis on September 14 of that year, at the age of 88. He is buried in the Hollywood Cemetery, in South Memphis, where his grave bears two headstones. The second, larger headstone, was purchased by fans.

Discography
 Furry Lewis, 1959
 Back on My Feet Again, 1961 
 Done Changed My Mind, 1962
 Fourth & Beale, 1969
 Live at the Gaslight at the Au Go Go, 1971
 The Alabama State Troupers Road Show, 1973

References

External links
 Fansite reminiscences
 
 Mini-biography @ cr.nps.gov 
 Furry Lewis on Myspace
 Mississippi Blues Trail
 Illustrated Furry Lewis discography
 

1890s births
1981 deaths
African-American guitarists
American blues guitarists
American male guitarists
Memphis blues musicians
American blues singer-songwriters
Blues revival musicians
Country blues singers
American street performers
Fat Possum Records artists
Songster musicians
People from Greenwood, Mississippi
Musicians from Memphis, Tennessee
Vocalion Records artists
Victor Records artists
Barclay Records artists
Universal Records artists
20th-century American guitarists
Singer-songwriters from Tennessee
Singer-songwriters from Mississippi
Guitarists from Mississippi
Guitarists from Tennessee
African-American male singer-songwriters
Southland Records artists
Folkways Records artists
20th-century African-American male singers